West Bengal Film Journalists' Association Awards commonly referred as WBFJA Awards, is given by The West Bengal Film Journalists' Association. The association was founded in 2013 in Kolkata. The award show is called Cinemar Somaborton.

Overview 
WBFJA can be called the successors of BFJA the oldest association of film critics in India, which was founded in 1939. BFJA used to felicitate Indian Cinema every year. In 2013, the last BFJA Awards were held in Kolkata, same year as the WBFJA was founded. That was the time WBFJA decided to be the successor of BFJA by giving awards to the Bengali Cinema in particular.

In 2017, four years after establishment WBFJA decided to hold their first award ceremony and to honor the Bengali Films of the previous year. Unlike BFJA, WBFJA Awards are only for the Bengali Films. In 2018, after success of their first award show they announced the 2nd edition of WBFJA Awards. In 2019, they announced their 3rd edition.

Ceremonies

Awards 
WBFJA has 18 awards in the popular category and 8 awards in the technical category.

Popular awards 
 Best Film
 Best Director
 Best Actor in a Leading Role
 Best Actress in a Leading Role
 Best Actor in a Supporting Role
 Best Actress in a Supporting Role
 Best Actor in a Negative Role
 Best Actor in a Comic Role
 Best Music
 Best Male Playback Singer
 Best Female Playback Singer
 Best Background Score
 Most Promising Director
 Most Promising Actor
 Most Promising Actress
 Most Popular Film of the Year
 Most Popular Actor of the Year
 Lifetime Achievement Award

Technical awards 
 Best Art Director
 Best Screenplay
 Best Cinematographer
 Best Costume Designer
 Best Sound Designer
 Best Make-Up Artist
 Best Editor
 Best Lyricist

Lifetime Achievement Award

See also 
 Bengali cinema

References

External links 
 West Bengal Film Journalists' Association – Official website

2017 establishments in West Bengal
Awards established in 2017
Bengal film awards
Civil awards and decorations of West Bengal
Indian film awards